Motaalleq Mahalleh-ye Nowbijar (also Romanized as Mota‘alleq Maḩalleh-ye Nowbījār; also known as Mota‘aleq Maḩalleh and Mota‘alleq Maḩalleh) is a village in Layalestan Rural District, in the Central District of Lahijan County, Gilan Province, Iran. At the 2006 census, its population was 303, in 108 families.

References 

Populated places in Lahijan County